Jamel is a German village in the municipality of Gägelow, in the Nordwestmecklenburg district, Mecklenburg-Vorpommern.

History

Geography

Extremism
, the village of about 35 people has been heavily populated by German neo-Nazis and other far-right extremists who are mostly members or voters of the National Democratic Party of Germany. NPD member Sven Krüger lives there after his release in 2016 from prison for illegal weapon possession. Properties in the village are being let to other NPD sympathizers.

A signpost near the main road pointed to Vienna, Paris, and to the birthplace of Adolf Hitler, Braunau am Inn. In April 2011, the administrative court at Schwerin confirmed the order of the head official of Amt Grevesmühlen-Land, that the sign corresponds to the definition of Volksverhetzung (hate crime) and had to be removed. , the sign was still displayed, albeit on private property. There is also a playground with a life rune (the Nordic symbol for fertility and life, commonly used by Neo-Nazis) on a tree trunk.

See also 
 Leith, North Dakota and Harrison, Arkansas, American towns with similar reputations for far-right politics
  non-nazi festival

References

External links

 Life in a Neo-Nazi Village video article from The Daily Telegraph
 Neo-Nazis Take Over German Village on The Young Turks

Villages in Mecklenburg-Western Pomerania
1230s establishments in the Holy Roman Empire
1230 establishments in Europe
Neo-Nazism in Germany